Patricia Jean Langhorne  (born 1955) is an Antarctic sea ice researcher. She retired as Professor in the physics department at the University of Otago, New Zealand in 2020.  She was previously head of department (2012–2015). She was New Zealand's leading sea ice physicist. For a time she led the observational component of one of New Zealand’s National Science Challenges – the Deep South.

Early life and education
Langhorne was born in 1955 in Glasgow, Scotland. Her early life was spent in Torrance, near Kirkintilloch and she completed her schooling at Kilsyth Academy. She gained a degree in Physics from the University of Aberdeen. From there she moved to Clare Hall at the University of Cambridge, UK, where she completed her PhD in 1982, under the supervision of Peter Wadhams, on crystal alignment in sea ice.  She then held a fellowship with Newnham College, supported by Rolls-Royce, at the Whittle Laboratory, Cambridge.
-

Career and impact
In 1985 she was invited to take part in an Antarctic experiment which brought her to New Zealand for the first time.  This resulted in collaboration on examining the strength of sea ice with Bill Robinson, Vernon Squire and Tim Haskell. The work was published in Nature and underpinned the use of sea ice runways for large aircraft.  Since 1988 her work has focused on teaching physics and researching sea ice physical processes at the University Otago.  Langhorne was Head of the Department of Physics at the University of Otago from 2012-2015.  Her work has involved over 20 twenty research visits to Antarctica, mostly to the Ross Sea region.  She has published extensively on the mechanical properties of sea ice under cyclic loading and its break-up by ocean waves, on the accretion and properties of frazil ice beneath the McMurdo fast ice, and other aspects of sea ice and ice shelves.

Langhorne has been involved in the organization of international scientific associations including the International Glaciological Society (IGS) and the International Association for Hydro-Environment Engineering and Research (IAHR).

Her leadership in the area was recognised with her being awarded funding to lead the field component of one of the New Zealand National Science challenges, the Deep South, seeking to determine high latitude climate impacts on New Zealand.

Honours

In 2017, Langhorne was selected as one of the Royal Society Te Apārangi's "150 women in 150 words", a project celebrating the contributions of women to expanding knowledge in New Zealand. 

In the 2019 New Year Honours, Langhorne was awarded the New Zealand Antarctic Medal, for services to Antarctic science.

References

External links
 Pat Langhorne's webpage
 

New Zealand women scientists
1955 births
Living people
Academic staff of the University of Otago
Scientists from Glasgow
Alumni of the University of Aberdeen
Alumni of Clare Hall, Cambridge
New Zealand Antarctic scientists
Women earth scientists
20th-century women scientists
Recipients of the New Zealand Antarctic Medal